The Rind is a Baloch tribe. According to Baloch folklore the tribe was founded by Rind Khan, one of Mir Jalal Khan's four sons.

History
According to Ali Sher Kanei of Tatta in his history, written in 1774 A.D. traces the origin of the Rind tribe from Jalāl Hān, a descendant of Muhammad bin Hārūn, surnamed Makurāni, the Governor of Makurān and of the Indian frontiers under Al-Hajjaj ibn Yusuf ( 705 A.D.) on the accession of Caliph Al-Walid I. The same author states that Muhammad son of Hărūn was a grandson of Muhammad bin Aban bin Abd - ur - Rahim bin Hamzah ibn Abdul-Muttalib , the paternal uncle of the Prophet of  Islam. 

At the turn of the 15th century the Rind led by Mir Chakar Rind are believed to have engaged in a 30-year war against the Lashari, in which both tribes suffered greatly but most of the Lasharis wiped out. These events are the subject of many Balochi heroic ballads.

Notable people
Kadu Makrani, a revolutionary of Gujarat associated with the Indian independence movement
Mir Chakar Rind, a chieftain who aided in the establishment of Mughal hegemony in medieval India
Yar Muhammad Rind is a Baloch politician who is member of the Provincial Assembly of the Balochistan.

References

Baloch tribes